During 1995, tropical cyclones formed within seven different bodies of water called basins. To date, 110 tropical cyclones formed, of which 74 were given names by various weather agencies. The costliest storm of the year was Hurricane Opal, which caused $4.7 billion in damage throughout Central America and the Gulf Coast of the United States.

1995 was a slightly below-average year for tropical cyclone formation; the most active basin of the year was the Western Pacific basin, featuring a slightly below-average number of storms. The Northern Atlantic was highly active, becoming the fourth-most active hurricane season on record. Both the Eastern Pacific and the Northern Indian Ocean basins were below-average, with the Eastern Pacific featuring 11 systems, a record low for the basin. The Southern Hemisphere was relatively average, with the exception of the Southern Pacific, where both the 1994–95 and 1995–96 seasons became some of the most inactive seasons in the basin on record. Four Category 5 tropical cyclones were formed in 1995.

Global atmospheric and hydrological conditions
During the early months of 1995, an El Niño was still in effect throughout the Eastern Pacific, though by June it had transitioned into a La Niña as the waters cooled rapidly.

Summary

Systems

January
January was an inactive month, featuring only 6 systems of which 5 attained gale-force winds and were named. Bentha stayed mostly out to sea, bringing rainfall and winds to the Mascarene Islands. Celeno was a rare tropical cyclone that formed in the Mediterranean Sea, making landfall on Libya. Dorina was the strongest storm of the month, peaking as an intense tropical cyclone. Fodah affected the landmasses surrounding the Mozambique Channel and Gail produced heavy gusts in the Mascarene Islands. Only 1 storm, 01W, was not part of the 1994–95 South-West Indian Ocean cyclone season.

February

February was an extremely inactive month, featuring only 3 systems of which all 3 were named by their respective Regional Specialized Meteorological Centres. Heida, the first storm of the month, stayed out to sea, affecting no landmasses. Bobby became the strongest storm of the month, making landfall near Onslow on February 25, causing $8.5 million in damages and killing 8 people as a result. Ingrid was also a relatively strong storm, causing wind gusts over the Mascarene Islands.

March

April

April was an extremely inactive month, featuring only 4 systems, of which 2 had gale-force winds and were named. Chloe was the first storm of the month, reaching the highest category on the Australian scale, making it the strongest storm of the month. Chloe made landfall just shy of peak intensity. 20P was a short-lived system, lasting for only one day. Cyclone Agnes was a strong but also small cyclone, peaking as a Category-3 equivalent cyclone. Tropical Storm Chuck was the final storm of the month, staying out to sea for the duration of its life.

May

May was an exceptionally weak month, with none of the 7 systems that formed intensifying into tropical storms. BOB 01 and BOB 02 were the first storms of the month, with BOB 02 causing 39 fatalities in Andhra Pradesh. A tropical depression formed thereafter and became the strongest storm of the month, with a minimum central pressure of 996 hPa. BOB 03 formed a day later, killing 107 people in Odisha. One-E became the first storm of the 1995 Pacific hurricane season; it affected no landmasses. The month finished with 2 tropical depressions forming in the Western Pacific.

June

June was an inactive month, featuring 6 systems, of which 4 were named. Deanna was the first storm of the month, affecting the Philippines, Taiwan, and China. Allison was the second storm of the month and the first in the 1995 Atlantic hurricane season, peaking as a Category 1 hurricane and affecting the Southeastern United States. Tropical Storm Eli and 2 unnamed tropical depression in the Western Pacific were all weak and relatively short-lived.

July

August

September

October

November

November was an inactive month, with only 5 systems having formed in the month, of which 3 were named by their respective agencies. Brian was the first storm of the month, having stayed out to sea. BOB 06, also known as the 1995 India cyclone, caused extensive loss of life throughout India and Nepal, with a significant portion of the deaths being related to avalanches or landslides. Colleen was a weak and short-lived storm in the Western Pacific that stayed out to sea. Daryl–Agnielle was a strong cyclone that stayed out to sea, peaking as a Category 5 cyclone on the Saffir–Simpson scale and becoming the strongest storm of the month. BOB 07 was another deadly cyclone, killing 172 people, of which at least 100 were fishermen.

December

Global effects

See also

 Tropical cyclones by year
 List of earthquakes in 1995
 Tornadoes of 1995

Notes
2 Only systems that formed either on or after January 1, 1995 are counted in the seasonal totals.
3 Only systems that formed either before or on December 31, 1995 are counted in the seasonal totals.4 The wind speeds for this tropical cyclone/basin are based on the IMD Scale which uses 3-minute sustained winds.
5 The wind speeds for this tropical cyclone/basin are based on the Saffir Simpson Scale which uses 1-minute sustained winds.
6 The wind speeds for this tropical cyclone/basin are based on Météo-France which uses wind gusts.

References

External links

Regional Specialized Meteorological Centers
 US National Hurricane Center – North Atlantic, Eastern Pacific
 Central Pacific Hurricane Center – Central Pacific
 Japan Meteorological Agency – NW Pacific
 India Meteorological Department – Bay of Bengal and the Arabian Sea
 Météo-France – La Reunion – South Indian Ocean from 30°E to 90°E
 Fiji Meteorological Service – South Pacific west of 160°E, north of 25° S

Tropical Cyclone Warning Centers
 Meteorology, Climatology, and Geophysical Agency of Indonesia – South Indian Ocean from 90°E to 141°E, generally north of 10°S
 Australian Bureau of Meteorology (TCWC's Perth, Darwin & Brisbane) – South Indian Ocean & South Pacific Ocean from 90°E to 160°E, generally south of 10°S
 Papua New Guinea National Weather Service – South Pacific Ocean from 141°E to 160°E, generally north of 10°S
 Meteorological Service of New Zealand Limited – South Pacific west of 160°E, south of 25°S

Tropical cyclones by year
1995 Atlantic hurricane season
1995 Pacific hurricane season
1995 Pacific typhoon season
1995 North Indian Ocean cyclone season
1994–95 Australian region cyclone season
1995–96 Australian region cyclone season
1994–95 South Pacific cyclone season
1995–96 South Pacific cyclone season
1994–95 South-West Indian Ocean cyclone season
1995–96 South-West Indian Ocean cyclone season
1995-related lists